Clémentine or Clementine is a feminine given name (derivative of Clement). Notable people with the name include:
 Marie-Clémentine Valadon (better known as Suzanne Valadon) (1865-1938), a French artist and Renoir’s art model
 Princess Clémentine of Belgium (1872–1955)
 Princess Clémentine of Orléans (1817–1907)
Clementine Abel (1826 - 1905), a German writer
 Clémentine Autain (born 1973), a French politician
 Clementine Barnabet (c.1894-c.1923), African-American serial killer and mass murderer
 Clémentine Célarié (born 1957), a French actress
 Clementine Churchill, Baroness Spencer-Churchill (1885–1977), the wife of Sir Winston Churchill
Clementine de Vere (1888-1973), Belgium born magician & illusionist known as Ionia
 Clémentine Delait (1865–1939), a French bearded lady who kept a café
Clémentine Delauney (born 1987), a French singer, vocalist for the symphonic metal band Visions of Atlantis
 Clémentine Deliss (born 1960), a researcher
 Clementine Deymann, (1844–1896), a German-American priest and prison chaplain
 Clementine Ford (born 1979), an American actress
 Clementine Ford (born 1981), an Australian writer
 Clementine Hunter (c. 1886/1887–1988), an African American self-taught folk artist
 Clementine Jacoby, American software engineer and criminal justice reform activist
 Clémentine Nzuji (born 1944), an African poet and linguist
 Clementine Paddleford (1898–1967), an American food writer
 Clémentine Solignac (1894–2008), a French supercentenarian
 Clementine Stoney (born 1981), an Australian swimmer
 Clémentine (musician) (born 1963), a French singer-songwriter based in Japan
 Clementine (musician) (born 1976), a Filipino singer, lead vocalist for Oranges and Lemons

Fictional characters 
 Clementine, the character on HBO's Westworld, former madam of 'Mariposa' brothel
 Clementine, the heroine of a series of children's books by Sara Pennypacker
 Clementine Kruczynski, a role played by Kate Winslet in Eternal Sunshine of the Spotless Mind
 Clementine, a Muppet character on Sesame Street
 Clementine Johnson, a minor character on the TV series Reno 911!
 Clementine, a main character in the video game series The Walking Dead
 Dr. Clementine Chasseur, a character on the TV series "Hemlock Grove"
 Clementine, a black female character from the Canadian animated preschool TV series Caillou
 Clementine, a robotic NPC character from the 2022 video game Stray (video game)

See also 
 
 
 Clemence, a given name and surname
 Clement (disambiguation)
 Clementina (disambiguation)
 Clementine (disambiguation)

fr:Clémentine (homonymie)#Prénom